Silesians Together (Silesian: Ślonzoki Razem) is Silesian regionalist political party in Poland.

The party is not officially in favor of Silesian independence. It believes that the pre-war autonomy of the Silesian Voivodeship should be restored. However, politicians of Silesians Together does not exclude the support of the project of the independent Silesian state in the event that this project is supported by the majority of Silesians.

In the 2018 local elections Silesians Together formed its own election committees in few constituencies. In 2019 European elections its politicians started from lists of Poland Fair Play and Kukiz'15. For parliamentary elections in the same year Silesians Together became part of Polish Coalition led by Polish People's Party.

Political parties in Poland
Political parties established in 2017